Gana is an attendant of the Hindu god Shiva.

Gana may also refer to:

Places
 Gana, Burkina Faso
 Gana, Iran
 Gana, Poland
 Gana, Tibet
 Ghana Empire, an empire in what is now western Mali that flourished between the fourth and thirteenth centuries

Politics
 Grand Alliance for National Unity, a political party in El Salvador
 Grand National Alliance (Guatemala), a political party in Guatemala
 Gana Perú or Peru Wins, a political party in Peru

Other uses
Gana people of Botswana
 Ganas, an intentional community in New York City
 Gana (nickname)
 Gaṇa (prosody), a technical term in Sanskrit prosody
 Idrissa Gana Gueye, Senegalese footballer
 Gana or Ledet, see Christmas in Ethiopia and Eritrea

See also
 Ghana (disambiguation)
 Ganna (disambiguation)
 Gaana, Indian music
 Gaana (music streaming service), Indian website